Jeremy Smith (born 1964) is a historian whose research has focused on the non-Russian nationalities of the Soviet Union. Smith's work has challenged some of the Cold War views of Richard Pipes.

Works

References

 

Historians of the Soviet Union
Scholars of nationalism
Date of birth missing (living people)
Place of birth missing (living people)
Living people
1964 births